The Embassy of the State of Palestine in United Arab Emirates is the diplomatic mission of the Palestine in UAE. It is located in Abu Dhabi.

See also

List of diplomatic missions of Palestine.

References

Diplomatic missions of the State of Palestine
Diplomatic missions in Abu Dhabi
State of Palestine–United Arab Emirates relations